Julián Trujillo Largacha (January 28, 1828- July 18, 1883) was a Colombian lawyer, statesman, General of the Army and President of Colombia from 1878 to 1880.

Biographic data 

Trujillo was born  in Popayán, Cauca, on January 28, 1828. He died in Bogotá, Cundinamarca, on July 18, 1883.

Early life 

Trujillo studied jurisprudence and graduated as a lawyer in 1849.

Private life 

Trujillo married Doña Dolores Thorny Carvajal, with whom he had 7 children.

Military career 

In 1875, Trujillo enlisted in the army to defend the government of President Aquileo Parra against the conservative revolt. He participated in the battle of "Los Chancos", where the national army defeated the conservative upraise. He was ascended to the rank of General. Later, Trujillo leads the government’s forces in the successful seizure of Manizales, mayor stronghold of the conservative army. He is ascended to the rank of Great General.

Political career 

After Trujillo’s military victory in the seizure of Manizales, and the granting of amnesty to the conservative opponents, he is appointed as Military and Civilian Chief of the city of Manizales. In 1877, he is designated as President of the State of Antioquia, to replace the defeated and deposed Silverio Arango.

The Presidency  

In March, 1877, Trujillo is nominated as candidate for the liberal party by General Tomás Cipriano de Mosquera and Manuel Murillo Toro, one month before his arrival to the city of Medellín. This nomination was to honor the desires of General Rafael Núñez, who had expressed his wishes in a letter to General Fernando Ponce, dated October 28, 1876, in which he stated that General Trujillo was the most qualified to be President of Colombia. Both wings of the liberal party, radicals and independents, united in support for the candidacy of Trujillo. He was elected president without opposition from the conservative party, who had been defeated in the war and decided not to take part in this presidential election.

References

External links
Julián Trujillo Largacha biography (in Spanish)

1828 births
1883 deaths
People from Popayán
Colombian people of Spanish descent
Colombian Liberal Party politicians
Presidents of Colombia
Presidential Designates of Colombia
Colombian generals
Ambassadors of Colombia to Ecuador